Maksim Fomin (born 12 October 2000) is a Lithuanian biathlete who has competed at the Biathlon World Cup.

In 2022 Fomin become world junior champion in summer super-sprint event.

Biathlon results
All results are sourced from the International Biathlon Union.

World Championships
0 medals

*During Olympic seasons competitions are only held for those events not included in the Olympic program.
**The single mixed relay was added as an event in 2019.

References

2000 births
Living people
Lithuanian male biathletes